Pseudaletis michelae is a butterfly in the family Lycaenidae. It is found in Cameroon, the Republic of the Congo and the Democratic Republic of the Congo.

References

Butterflies described in 2007
Pseudaletis